FK Železnik is a football club based in Železnik, Belgrade, Serbia. They competed in the First League of Serbia and Montenegro from 1996 to 2005. The club made its solo European appearance in the 2004–05 UEFA Cup and went on to win the Serbia and Montenegro Cup in the same season.

History
Founded as Železnički SK on 28 May 1930, the club became more organized during the 1950s. They changed their name to FK Železnik in 1961, following a merger with FK Napredak, which was originally created by the Ivo Lola Ribar Institute. Between 1963 and 1967, the club competed in the Serbian League North, the third tier of Yugoslav football. They lost to Sloboda Užice in the promotion playoffs to the Yugoslav Second League in 1965.

The club continued to participate at regional level without notable achievements until 1993, when Jusuf "Jusa" Bulić acquired the club. They won the Serbian League North in the 1994–95 season and took promotion to the Second League of FR Yugoslavia. In the 1995–96 season, the club was promoted to the First League of FR Yugoslavia (I/B League). They finished second in the I/B League in the 1996–97 season, earning them a spot in the I/A League in the 1997–98 season.

After the assassination of his father, Dragan "Aca" Bulić took over the club in May 1998. Led by the youngest club president in the history of FR Yugoslavia football, they continued to progress rapidly, finishing in a higher league position every season. Simultaneously, the club reached the semi-finals of the national cup in two consecutive seasons in 2002 and 2003, but was eliminated by Sartid Smederevo on both occasions.

In the 2003–04 season, the club achieved its best league performance by finishing in third place, thus securing a spot in the 2004–05 UEFA Cup. They were eliminated by Romanian club Steaua București in the second qualifying round, losing 5–4 on aggregate. Despite only finishing ninth in the league that season, the club made the biggest success in its history by winning the Serbia and Montenegro Cup.

In June 2005, due to financial difficulties, the club was forced to withdraw its participation from the 2005–06 UEFA Cup. They eventually merged with another Belgrade-based club Voždovac, which continued to compete in the 2005–06 Serbia and Montenegro SuperLiga.

Refounded as FK Železnik Lavovi, the club started competing in the Belgrade Third League, the seventh tier of Serbian football. They subsequently earned two promotions in two seasons, reaching the Belgrade First League in 2008. After three years in the fifth tier, the club gained promotion to the Belgrade Zone League in 2011. They subsequently secured promotion to the Serbian League Belgrade in 2012. After spending three seasons in the third tier, the club merged with Radnički Beograd in the summer of 2015 and was later refounded in lowest league.

Honours

League
Serbian League North (Tier 3)
 1994–95
Belgrade First League (Tier 5)
 2010–11
Belgrade Second League (Tier 6)
 2007–08
Belgrade Third League (Tier 7)
 2006–07 (Group A)

Cup
Serbia and Montenegro Cup
 2004–05

Seasons

Notes

European record

Notable players
This is a list of players who have played at full international level.

  Branimir Subašić
  Zoran Janković
  Đorđije Ćetković
  Radomir Đalović
  Dejan Damjanović
  Milan Jovanović
  Mitar Novaković
  Antonio Filevski
  Milan Biševac
  Jovan Damjanović
  Marko Lomić
  Ivan Dudić
  Aleksandar Jović
  Oliver Kovačević
  Saša Kovačević
  Nikola Lazetić
  Jovan Markoski
  Slobodan Marković
  Aleksandar Pantić
  Dejan Rađenović
  Marko Dević

For a list of all FK Železnik players with a Wikipedia article, see :Category:FK Železnik players.

Managerial history

References

External links
 Club page at Srbijasport

1930 establishments in Serbia
2015 disestablishments in Serbia
Association football clubs disestablished in 2015
Association football clubs established in 1930
Football clubs in Belgrade
Čukarica